Normalair-Garrett Limited (NGL), or Normalair, was a British manufacturing company established in 1946 in Yeovil, Somerset, England, which manufactured high altitude life support equipment for the aerospace industry. Since 1999 it has been a wholly owned subsidiary of Honeywell International Inc, known as Honeywell Aerospace Yeovil (HAY).

Formation 

The company grew out of the Westland Aircraft Company, who in 1933 enabled the Houston Everest expedition to make the first flight over Mount Everest, using oxygen and heating systems – precursors of the systems that would eventually be produced by Normalair.

Westland Aircraft produced a cabin pressurisation control valve in 1941 for use in the Westland Welkin high altitude fighter bomber aircraft. Though the Welkin never reached full-scale production the same valve was used in Mosquito, Wellington and Spitfire aircraft.

At the end of World War II, Westland had decided to focus on building helicopters, for which their high altitude technology was of no use; and on 15 March 1946 Normalair Limited was established on the Westland site in Yeovil. Ted Boulger was appointed general manager. with J Fearn as Westland Board Director with responsibility for the new company.

During the 1950s the company grew and continued to focus upon providing equipment that would allow aviators to operate at high altitude. In 1951 the company signed an agreement with the Eclipse Pioneer division of Bendix Aviation, now also owned by Honeywell, to manufacture and modify oxygen breathing regulators for aircrew. During this period, the Royal Aircraft Establishment gave the company responsibility for all military oxygen work and as a result the company acquired complete life support systems capability including oxygen masks and emergency oxygen supply.

In anticipation of the long range support needed by the de Havilland Comet, Normalair set up subsidiaries in Melbourne, Australia and Toronto, Canada. The company employed 250 people in 1954 and in the same year produced LOX (Liquid Oxygen) converters for the F-86 Sabre of the German Air Force.

Diversification

1950s and 1960s 
In 1957 the publication of Duncan Sandys' Defence White Paper led to the cancellation of many aircraft projects. The company decided to diversify into other markets and took a licence from Drägerwerke, of Germany, to produce compressed air diving and oxygen breathing apparatus. Normalair achieved most success with portable oxygen systems, including the equipment supplied for the first successful ascent, by Tenzing and Hillary, of Mount Everest.

Relatively short-lived was Normalair's entry into the automotive air conditioning market, where the systems were optional extras on Wolseley Wolseley 6/110, Austin Westminster 110, Vanden Plas Princess, Land Rovers and some Rolls-Royces. However the company was some thirty years too early as demand for air conditioned cars in Europe did not materialise; the company withdrew from the market in 1964.

In 1960, further agreements with Bendix brought licensed production of hydraulic servo valves. This expertise was then developed for electro-hydraulic servo valves, actuators and lightweight solenoid-operated hydraulic valves. The company also produced marine hydraulics and valves for submarines.

Also in 1960, the Industrial Electronics Division was formed to use data logging technology brought from Saunders-Roe, after parent company Westland took them over. At the same time the company was involved with development and production of regulators for Harrier and UK Phantom aircraft. The company won a Queens Award to Industry for Export in 1966.

Normalair's high altitude laboratory included a chamber large enough to accommodate a full-size mock-up of the Concorde fuselage. This was used for trials simulating the effects of supersonic cruise at up to 60,000 ft, nearly twice the operating altitude of contemporary airliners. As well as conducting these tests, Normalair developed the cabin pressure control equipment providing a comfortable environment for passengers.

1970s 
Several major contracts were won in 1972 to supply the Multi Role Combat Aircraft (MRCA) later to be named Panavia Tornado.  In the same year the company acquired the Westland foundry business in Hayes and transferred it to the Drayton Hydroflex premises in Chard, Somerset. Also in that year, Julian Nott set the world altitude record for a hot air balloon of 35,971 ft using a balloon with NGL oxygen equipment.

NGL won several contracts in 1974 to supply the HS146 regional jet, now called the BAe 146, with air conditioning and air systems management equipment.

Diversification continued with the purchase of Facet Enterprises filtration licenses from Voles in 1976. In the same year Normalair’s filtration division was formed in the former glove making factory at Shepton Beauchamp, where it remained for ten years before being moved to the Lynx Trading Estate in Yeovil near to the main plant.

The last vapour cycle air conditioning systems developed by Normalair were fitted to export versions of Alvis Stormer and Scorpion armoured vehicles, and the Khaled tank (a version of the Centurion sold in the Middle East). The company later opted out of making vapour cycle systems to concentrate on air cycle systems only. This decision was to be vindicated 15 years later when the Montreal Protocol saw the end of systems using chlorofluorocarbons and similar gases.

In 1977 NGL began development of its first in-house designed aircraft data recorder, a sealed maintenance recorder for the McDonnell Douglas (now Boeing) F/A-18 Hornet A/B. The recorder had to meet unprecedented environmental and accuracy specifications, and was Normalair’s first order for US defence equipment. The F/A-18 unit placed Normalair at the forefront of aircraft recorder technology and a dedicated electronics division was set up at Clarence Street, near to the former Huish football ground.

The height of Normalair’s fame came with the appearance of the Deep Dive 500 closed circuit breathing system (scuba set) in the James Bond film For Your Eyes Only. The system minimised the emission of bubbles which made it suitable for covert naval operations.

Later ownership

Garrett Corporation
In 1966 the American Garrett Corporation took a 48% shareholding in the company, which was subsequently renamed Normalair-Garrett Limited (NGL). At this time the company had more than 1,300 employees.

NGL took over one of its main competitors, Teddington Aircraft Controls, in 1971. In the same year the company also acquired Aircraft Supplies Limited of Bournemouth, whose premises were used to set up NGL's product support activities. The company had entered into numerous license agreements during its history, and in this year it agreed to license manufacture of oxygen and environmental control systems to Hindustan Aeronautics Limited, of India, for production of the HJT 16 aircraft.

Garret had merged with Signal Oil and Gas in 1964, and in 1985 the combined company merged with Allied Corp., becoming Allied-Signal.

GKN 
The GKN conglomerate built up a stake in Westland and took full control in 1994; as a result GKN owned 48% of Normalair-Garrett, which thus was effectively a joint venture between AlliedSignal and GKN.

Honeywell 
GKN sold its 48% stake in Normalair-Garrett to the American AlliedSignal in 1999, making Normalair a wholly owned subsidiary of AlliedSignal. In the same year, AlliedSignal bought Honeywell and adopted the Honeywell name for the merged companies. In May 2000, the company name was changed from Normalair-Garrett Limited to Honeywell Normalair-Garrett Limited.

Notes

Sources

 Celebrating fifty years of Normalair – A brief history. M.P. Bednall 
 A W Gregg for source information up to 1974

Aircraft component manufacturers of the United Kingdom
Companies based in Yeovil
Honeywell
Science and technology in Somerset
British companies established in 1946
Companies established in 1946
Manufacturing companies of the United Kingdom
Aerospace companies
1946 establishments in England